Chandana D. Wickramaratne is a Sri Lankan police officer. He is the current Inspector General of Police, he was confirmed on 25 November 2020 after having served as the Acting Inspector General of Police from April 2019.

Easter bombings 
On the 26 April 2019, President Maithripala Sirisena ordered the Inspector General of Police, Pujith Jayasundara, to resign over intelligence failures that led to the fatal Easter bomb attacks. Jayasundara refused to resign and was put on compulsory leave with Wickramaratne appointed as the acting Inspector General. The temporary appointment became a controversy as Jayasundara denied the allegations levelled against him by the President filed a court case against the government regarding the intelligence lapse.

Wickramaratne was a Senior Deputy Inspector General, when he was appointed to the role of acting Inspector-General of Police, when the incumbent, Jayasundara, was suspended following the 2019 Easter bombings. On 13 May 2019, C. D. Wickramaratne was approved to work as acting IGP by the Constitutional Council.

Other cases 
He also ordered a special investigation to probe statements made by former LTTE cadre Karuna Amman who claimed to have killed more than 3000 army soldiers at the Elephant Pass during the war and claimed that he was barbaric than the COVID-19 related fatalities in the country.

References 

Sri Lankan Inspectors General of Police
Living people
Sinhalese police officers
Date of birth missing (living people)
Year of birth missing (living people)